Zikri Akbar (born 8 May 1992) is an Indonesian professional footballer who plays as a left back. He spent his youth career at Paraguayan Escula Empoli and then played for Club Cerro Porteño along with fellow Indonesian, Rahmanuddin.

Club career

Persita Tangerang
He played since 2013 for Persita Tangerang. He scored his first goal in a 2–4 loss against Semen Padang on 7 June 2014.

Honours

Club
Persita Tangerang
 Liga 2 runner-up: 2019

References

External links
 
 Zikri Akbar at Liga Indonesia

1992 births
Living people
Indonesian footballers
Indonesian expatriate footballers
Expatriate footballers in Paraguay
Cerro Porteño players
PSSB Bireuen players
Persita Tangerang players
Persija Jakarta players
Mitra Kukar players
People from Bireuën
Sportspeople from Aceh
Liga 1 (Indonesia) players
Association football wingers
Association football fullbacks